Hirschfeld is a municipality in the district Zwickau, in Saxony, Germany.

It is home to the Hirschfeld Wildlife Park.

References 

Zwickau (district)